The Eye of the Dragon Princess, also known as Long Wu Mu (Lóng wú mù, lit. dragon without eyes), is a 2020 Chinese fantasy film, directed by Liu Tao, produced by Beijing Oriental Feiyun International Film and Television Co., Ltd., starring Zhu Sheng Yi and
Peer Zhu in lead roles.
The film is adapted from Pu Songling's short story "Strange Tales from a Liaozhai", about the story of a drought in Xinzhou, the rain in "Sea Dragon Ball", and the love affairs of the dragon princess with "Lu Haisheng", a government official.

Plot 
Hai Lanzhu, the dragon princess, has the powers to order the water of the Tianhe to rain. She came to the human world with the task of causing rainfall. In the Dragon King Temple, she met Lu Haisheng, who came to solve a case. The two fell in love with each other. However, her precious eyes, became the prey for others in the selfish world. Even her lover was also pushed into the whirlpool of conspiracy because of her. After all, she defied the odds in the end.

Cast 
 Nicole Zhu as the Dragon Princess named "Hai Lanzhu"
 Peer Zhu as Lu Haisheng, Detective
 Sherman Ye as Xie Yun, Crab
 Meng Ziye as Rabbit Demon
 Olivia Yan as Yu He
 He Yin as Mother Lu
 Xu Xiaoqin as Tree God
 Chen Yue as Qing Qing
 Yang Qiyu as the Official

References

External links 
 
 
 
 
 
 

2020 films
Chinese fantasy films
Chinese mythology